Mugi (Dargwa: МухIи) is a rural locality (a selo) in Akushinsky District, Republic of Dagestan, Russia. The population was 3,372 as of 2010. There are 11 streets.

Geography 
Mugi is located 11 km northeast of Akusha (the district's administrative centre) by road. Zilmukmakhi is the nearest rural locality.

References 

Rural localities in Akushinsky District